"Present Truth" may refer to any of the following:

In the Seventh-day Adventist Church:
 Present truth, a belief in truth as appropriate to any given time 
 The Present Truth, the original title of the Adventist Review, the official church newsmagazine,  begun by Seventh-day Adventist Pioneer James Springer White.
 Present Truth Magazine, started by former Adventist Robert Brinsmead
 Present Truth in the Real World, a book by Adventist theologian Jon Paulien

In other Adventist groups:
 The Present Truth, or Meat in Due Season, a booklet by Jonas Wendell
 The Present Truth, a quarterly publication by the Laymen's Home Missionary Movement